This is a list of foreign players in the Azerbaijan Premier League, which commenced play in 1992. The following players must meet both of the following two criteria:
Have played at least one Premier League game. Players who were signed by Premier League clubs, but only played in lower league, cup and/or European games, or did not play in any competitive games at all, are not included.
Are considered foreign, i.e., outside Azerbaijan, determined by the following:
A player is considered foreign if he is not eligible to play for the national team of Azerbaijan.
More specifically,
If a player has been capped on international level, the national team is used; if he has been capped by more than one country, the highest level (or the most recent) team is used.
If a player has not been capped on international level, his country of birth is used, except those who were born abroad from Azerbaijan.

In bold: Current foreign Azerbaijan Premier League players and their present team.

Naturalized players 
  Richard Almeida – Qarabağ (2012–2018, 2019, 2021–), Zira (2020–2021)
  Andrezinho – Baku (2004–08), Karvan (2009)
  Fábio – Mil-Muğan (2005–06), Olimpik Baku (2006–08), Baku (2008–12)
  Leandro Gomes – Baku (2004–08), Olimpik Baku (2008–09), Karvan (2009)
  Marcos – Karvan (2005–10), Neftchi Baku (2007)
  Ernani Pereira – Karvan (2005–10)
  Filip Ozobić – Gabala (2016–2018), Qarabağ (2018–)
  Badri Kvaratskhelia – Kapaz (1997–98), Shamkir (1998–2005)
  Pardis Fardjad-Azad – Sumgayit (2012–16), Keşla  (2016–2018), Zira  (2018–19)
  Cihan Özkara – Simurq (2015)
  Ali Ghorbani – Sumgayit (2020–2022)
  Hojjat Haghverdi – Sumgayit (2021-2022)
  Ali Babayev – Sumgayit (2018–2019)
  Nduka Usim – AZAL (2004–13), Simurq (2014)
  Aleksey Isayev – Sumgayit (2018–2020), Sabah (2020–)
  Mehdi Jannatov – Sumgayit (2017–2021), Zira (2021–)
  Abdulla Khaybulayev – Sabah (2021–)
  Sergei Sokolov – Kapaz (2005), Qarabağ (2006), Simurq (2008–10), Gabala (2010–12)
  Branimir Subašić – Neftchi Baku (2005–08), Gabala (2010–11), Khazar Lankaran (2011–13), Qarabağ (2013)
  Magomed Kurbanov – Sumgayit (2014–17), Neftchi Baku (2015–16), Kapaz (2017)
  Pavlo Pashayev – Gabala (2015)

UEFA

Albania
Ervin Bulku – AZAL (2011–2012)
Eleandro Pema – AZAL (2010–2011)
Suad Liçi – Baku (2005–2006)
Isnik Alimi – Gabala (2021–)
Jurgen Goxha – Gabala (2020–2021), Sabail (2021–2022)
Sabien Lilaj – Gabala (2018–2019)
Emiljano Vila – Inter Baku (2015)
Elvin Beqiri – Khazar Lankaran (2010–2012)
Bruno Telushi – Neftçi (2020–2021)
Ansi Agolli – Qarabağ (2010–2011, 2012–2019)
Admir Teli – Qarabağ (2009–2015)
Redon Xhixha – Qarabağ (2023–)
Gerhard Progni – Zira (2016–2017)

Belarus
Gennadi Bliznyuk – AZAL (2011)
Artsyom Vaskow – Olimpik-Shuvalan (2009)
Mikhail Sivakow – Gabala (2015)
Valyantsin Byalkevich – Inter Baku (2008–09)
Mihail Makowski – Inter Baku (2004–06)
Uladzimir Makowski – Inter Baku (2004–06)
Andrey Milewski – Inter Baku (2004)
Vitaly Varivonchik – Inter Baku (2004–05)
Yegor Khvalko – Kapaz (2022–)
Alyaksandr Martseshkin – Khazar Lankaran (2004–06)
Igor Kovalevich – Khazar Lankaran (2004)
Andrey Lobanov – Khazar Lankaran (2004)
Dmitri Koltoviç – Khazar Lankaran (2004)
Syarhey Pawlyukovich – Khazar Lankaran (2007)
Yegor Bogomolsky – Neftçi (2022–)
Dmitri Parkhachev – Olimpik Baku (2007–08), Kapaz (2011–12)
Vital Lyadzyanyow – MKT Araz (2007)
Andrey Sherakow – Simurq (2009)
Viktor Tulyantsev – Qarabağ (2004)
Boris Karasyov – MKT Araz (2004–05)
Dmitri Tulintsev – Qarabağ (2003–04)
Belajdi Pusi – Turan-Tovuz (2023–)

Belgium
Emile Mpenza – Neftchi Baku (2010–12)
Benjamin Lambot – Simurq (2014–15)
Taner Taktak - Sumgayit (2012–13)
Loris Brogno – Zira (2021–)

Bosnia and Herzegovina
Predrag Bogosavljević – Göyazan Qazakh (2004–05)
Njegoš Matić – Göyazan Qazakh (2004–05)
Nedo Turković – AZAL (2014)
Saša Kajkut – Baku (2010–11)
Tomislav Stanić – Inter Baku (2006–07), Gänclärbirliyi Sumqayit (2007–08)
Ermin Zec – Gabala (2015–16)
Milija Žižić – Gabala (2008–09)
Eldin Adilović – Mughan (2009–10)
Adis Ćulov – Mughan (2009)
Irfan Fejzić – Mughan (2010–11)
Ekrem Hodžić – Mughan (2009–11), Ravan Baku (2011–13)
Edis Kurtanović – Mughan (2009–10), Kapaz (2010–11)
Amer Jugo – Mughan (2010–11)
Ilija Prodanović – Mughan (2010)
Irfan Rastoder – Mughan (2011)
Tomislav Višević – Neftchi Baku (2004–05), Olimpik Baku (2005)
Semjon Milošević – Olimpik Baku (2005)
Asmir Begović – Qarabağ (2019)
Nidal Ferhatović – Qarabağ (2007–09)
Ibrahim Šehić – Qarabağ (2013–2018)
Sedat Şahin – Qarabağ (2008–09)
Bojan Marković – Ravan Baku (2014)
Mario Marina – Sabah (2020–2021)
Bojan Letić – Sabah (2022–)
Mario Božić – Simurq (2012–13)
Nenad Kiso – Simurq (2013)
Dilaver Zrnanović – Simurq (2012–14)
Almir Aganspahić – Sumgayit (2022-)
Dalibor Dragić – Turan Tovuz (2006)

Bulgaria
Tomi Kostadinov – AZAL (2014)
Enyo Krastovchev – AZAL (2010–11), Inter Baku (2011–12)
Stanislav Bachev – Baku (2007–09)
Radomir Todorov – Khazar Lankaran (2007–10, 2012–13), Baku (2011)
Aleksandar Tomash – Baku (2008–09)
Asen Nikolov – Baku (2007–08), Gabala (2008)
Velichko Velichkov – Gabala (2010–11)
Daniel Genov – Inter Baku (2010–13), Simurq (2011–12)
Svilen Simeonov – Inter Baku (2007–09)
Georgi Vladimirov – Inter Baku (2007–08)
Zhivko Zhelev – Inter Baku (2010), Simurq (2011)
Petar Zlatinov – Inter Baku (2008–13)
Kostadin Dzhambazov – Khazar Lankaran (2007–09)
Galin Ivanov – Khazar Lankaran (2014)
Martin Stankov – Khazar Lankaran (2004–07)
Ivan Tsvetkov – Khazar Lankaran (2008–10)
Ahmed Ahmedov – Neftçi (2021)
Marcho Dafchev – Neftchi Baku (2008–09)
Svetoslav Petrov – Neftchi Baku (2006–09)
Ivan Karamanov – Qarabağ (2004–05)
Simeon Slavchev – Qarabağ (2018–2019)
Emil Martinov – Sabail (2018–2019, 2022–)
Nikolay Valev – Simurq (2009–10), Mughan (2010)
Martin Kerchev – Turan Tovuz (2011)
Boris Kondev – Turan Tovuz (2011)
Kiril Nikolov – Turan Tovuz (2005)

Croatia
Duje Baković – Baku (2012)
Marko Šarlija – Baku (2008–12)
Ernad Skulić – Baku (2008–12)
Aleksandar Šolić – Baku (2009–14)
Petar Franjić – Gabala (2016–17)
Vinko Međimorec – Gabala (2020–2021)
Ivica Žunić – Gabala (2019–2020)
Matija Špičić – Inter Baku (2013–15)
Mario Mustapic – Kapaz (2023–)
Robert Alviž – Khazar Lankaran (2012–13)
Marin Oršulić – Khazar Lankaran (2013)
Vjekoslav Tomić – Khazar Lankaran (2014–15)
Ivan Radoš – Kapaz (2012–13)
Slavko Bralić – Neftçi (2018–2019)
Ivan Brkić – Neftçi (2022–)
Darko Čordaš – Neftçi (2005–06)
Dario Melnjak – Neftçi (2016)
Mateo Mužek – Neftçi (2017–2018)
Goran Paracki – Neftçi (2018–2019)
Krševan Santini – Neftçi (2016)
Domagoj Kosić – Olimpik Baku (2005)
Boško Peraica – Olimpik Baku (2005)
Miro Varvodić – Qarabağ (2012–13)
Špiro Peričić – Sabah (2021–2022)
Adnan Hodžić – Simurq (2010–11)
Stjepan Poljak – Simurq (2012–15), Inter Baku (2015)
Tomislav Bušić – Simurq (2012–13)
Zdravko Popović – Simurq (2012–13)
Ivan Grabovac – Turan Tovuz (2012)
Anton Rukavina – Turan Tovuz (2012–13)
Ante Zurak – Turan Tovuz (2012)

Cyprus
Giorgos Pelagias – Baku – (2013–2015)

Czech Republic
Bronislav Červenka – Inter Baku (2007–2012)
Lubomír Kubica – Inter Baku (2009–2010)
Pavel Dreksa – Neftchi Baku (2017)
Zdeněk Folprecht – Neftchi Baku (2017)
Ivo Táborský – Inter Baku (2014)
Tomas Ineman – Khazar Lankaran (2009–2011)
Lukáš Třešňák – Simurq (2014)

England
Terry Cooke – Gabala (2010–2011)

Estonia
Sergei Zenjov – Gabala (2015–2017)
Tihhon Šišov – Khazar Lankaran (2010–2011)
Dmitri Kruglov – Neftchi Baku (2008, 2008–2010), Inter Baku (2010–2011), Ravan Baku (2014)
Taavi Rähn – Neftchi Baku (2009–2010)
Andrei Stepanov – Neftchi Baku (2009–2010)
Vladimir Voskoboinikov – Neftchi Baku (2010)
Artur Kotenko – Ravan Baku (2011)

France
Ender Günlü – Olimpik-Shuvalan (2009–2010), Turan Tovuz (2012–2013)
Franck Madou – AZAL (2017)
Stéphane Borbiconi – Baku  (2010–2011)
Bagaliy Dabo – Gabala (2016–2018), Neftçi (2018–2020)
Abdelrafik Gérard – Gabala (2020)
Steeven Joseph-Monrose – Gabala (2017–2019), Neftçi (2019–2021)
Yannick Kamanan – Gabala (2012–2014)
Yohan Bocognano – Inter Baku (2014–2015)
L'Imam Seydi – Inter Baku (2015)
Salif Cissé – Kapaz (2023–)
Romain Basque – Neftçi (2021)
Keelan Lebon – Neftçi (2023–)
Adama Diakhaby – Qarabağ (2023–)
Abdellah Zoubir – Qarabağ (2018–)
Dylan Duventru – Zira (2018–2019)
Hamidou Keyta – Zira (2022–)
Ben Sangaré – Zira (2017)
Chafik Tigroudja – Zira (2019–2020)

Georgia
İrakli Gelaşvili – Adliyya Baku
David Janalidze – Turan Tovuz (2012–13), Araz-Naxçıvan (2014), AZAL (2016–17)
Ramaz Dzhabnidze – AZAL (2009–10)
Roman Goginashvili – AZAL (2009–10)
Aleksandre Guruli – AZAL (2015–16)
Lasha Kasradze – AZAL (2014–15), Inter Baku (2015–16)
Nugzar Kvirtia – AZAL (2009–12, 2015–17), Turan Tovuz (2012–13)
Giorgi Demetradze – Baku (2008–09)
Merab Dzodzuashvili – Baku (2005)
Aleksandre Gogoberishvili – Baku (2005–08), Qarabağ (2008), AZAL (2009), Turan Tovuz (2011–12)
Giorgi Megreladze – Baku (2006–07)
George Popkhadze – Baku (2012–13)
Alexander Rekhviashvili – Baku (2005)
Amiran Mujiri – Baku (2007–10), Standard Sumgayit (2010)
Şota Cişkariani – Bakili Baku
David Kokaşvili – Bakili Baku
Tornike Aptsiauri – Gabala (2007–09)
Goga Beraia – Gabala, Kəpəz
Dmitri Ditmarxusişvili – Gabala (2006–07)
Giorgi Gabidauri – Gabala (2007–08)
Revaz Getsadze – Olimpik Baku (2008–09), Gabala (2009–10)
Dmitri Kapanadze – Gabala (2006–07)
Merab Gigauri – Gabala (2019–2021), Shamakhi (2021–2022)
Gorgi Krasovski – Gabala (2006–07)
Zurab Mamaladze – Gabala (2007–08)
Irakli Vashakidze – Gabala (2007–08)
Davit Volkovi – Gabala (2019), Zira (2020–2022), Sabah (2022–)
Laşa Coqiaşvili – Göyazan Qazax
Zaza Medoyev – Turan Tovuz (2005–06), Göyazan Qazax
Roman Çitadze – Turan Tovuz, Göyazan Qazax
Ilia Kandelaki – Inter Baku (2010–13)
Aleksandre Amisulashvili – Inter Baku (2014–15)
Aleksandre Iashvili – Inter Baku (2013–14)
Zurab Khizanishvili – Inter Baku (2015–17)
Nika Kvekveskiri – Inter Baku (2015–16), Gabala (2016–17)
Lasha Salukvadze – Inter Baku (2013–16)
Giorgi Lomaia – Inter Baku (2009–16)
Kakhaber Mzhavanadze – Inter Baku (2009–11)
Giorgi Navalovski – Inter Baku (2010), Neftchi Baku (2017)
David Odikadze – Inter Baku (2009–11)
Revaz Tevdoradze – Inter Baku
Kaxaber Cebisaşvili –  Khazar Universiteti Baku, Bakili Baku, Karat Baki
Armaz Çeladze – Karat Baki
Dmitri Arsoşvili – Karat Baki
Laşa Ambidze – Karat Baki
Roman Akhalkatsi – Karvan (2005–08), Olimpik Baku (2008–09), Simurq (2009–10)
Lekso Intskirveli – Karvan
Mixail Mesxi – Karvan
Gocha Trapaidze – Karvan (2004–08)
Irakli Beraia – Kəpəz, Turan Tovuz
Zura Dzamsashvili – Kəpəz, Turan Tovuz
Levan Mdivnishvili – Kəpəz
Mamuka Xundadze – Kəpəz
Nodari Papidze – Kəpəz
Roin Kerdzevadze – Kəpəz
Giorgi Kantaria – Kapaz (2022–)
Mate Kvirkvia – Kapaz (2022–)
Georgi Danibeqaşvili – Kəpəz, Polis Akademy Baku, MOIK Baku
Giorgi Sepiashvili – Kəpəz, Inter Baku
Valeri Abramidze – Neftchi Baku (2005–06, 2009–10), Khazar Lankaran (2006–07), Inter Baku (2010–13)
Davit Imedashvili – Khazar Lankaran (2005–06, 2010)
Timuri Çlaidze – Khazar Universiteti Baku
David Ciqoşvili – Khazar Universiteti Baku
Georgi Şukakidze – Khazar Universiteti Baku
David Menteşaşvili – Khazar Universiteti Baku
Georgi Tsagareishvili – Khazar Universiteti Baku
Arçil Soxadze – Khazar Universiteti Baku
Qoderdi Qoqoladze – Khazar Universiteti Baku, Gänclärbirliyi Sumqayit
Deviko Khinchagov – Masallı (2007–08)
Vaja Lomaşvili – Masallı
Boris Qonçarov – Masallı
Amiran Gventsadze – MOIK Baku
Givi Çxetiani – Mughan, Bakili Baku
George Gulordava – Mughan, Ravan Baku
Davit Svanidze – Mughan
Georgi Adamia – Neftchi Baku (2004–08), Baku (2008–10), Qarabağ (2010–12), Inter Baku  (2012–13)
Vato Arveladze – Neftçi (2022–)
Vladimir Burduli – Neftchi Baku (2010)
Otar Korgalidze – Neftchi Baku (1995)
Giorgi Chelidze – Neftchi Baku (2008–09)
Shota Chomakhidze – Neftchi Baku (2003), Qarabağ (2004)
Solomon Kvirkvelia – Neftçi (2022–)
Mikheil Khutsishvili – Kəpəz (2004–05), Olimpik Baku (2008)
Jaba Dvali – Qarabağ (2014)
Nikoloz Gelashvili – Qarabağ (2013–14)
Luka Gugeshashvili – Qarabağ (2022, 2022–)
Mikheil Ergemlidze – Sabah (2021–2022), Kapaz (2022)
David Qureşidze – Sahdag Qusar
Kakhaber Kvetenadze – Sahdag Qusar (2004–05)
Shalva Mumladze – Sahdag Qusar (2005)
Arçil Lobjanidze – Sahdag Qusar
Tornike Navruzaşvili – Sahdag Qusar
Luka Imnadze – Sabail (2021)
Malxas Çinçarauli – Shamkir
Demuri Kukuvava – Shamkir
Geli Qabisoniya – Shamkir
Gela Bartiya – Shamk
Davit Bolkvadze – Simurq (2008–10)
Kakhaber Chkhetiani – Simurq (2008–10)
Grigol Dolidze – Simurq (2008–09)
Teimuraz Gongadze – Simurq (2009–10)
Mikheil Makhviladze – Simurq (2008–09)
Mixail Alavidze – Standard Baku
David Çiçveyşvili – Standard Baku
Bachana Tskhadadze – Standard Baku (2008–09), Inter Baku (2010–15), Simurq (2010)
Vladimir Uqrexelidze – Standard Baku
Davit Chichveishvili – Standard Sumgayit (2008–10)
Sergi Orbeladze – Standard Sumgayit (2009–10)
Giorgi Seturidze – Standard Sumgayit (2009–10), Kəpəz (2010–11)
Levan Silagadze – Standard Sumgayit (2008–10)
Nika Apakidze – Sabail (2018)
Tamaz Tsetskhladze – Sabail (2017–2019)
Giorgi Beriashvili – Turan Tovuz (2011–12)
Timur Dmitriaşvili – Turan Tovuz
Georgi Chedia – Turan Tovuz
Giorgi Kilasonia – Turan Tovuz (2000–01), Neftchi Baku (2001–02)
Levan Chkhetiani – Turan Tovuz (2012–13)
Marat Dzakhmishev – Turan Tovuz (2010)
Oleg Gvelesiani – Turan Tovuz (2009), Standard Sumgayit (2011)
Zurab Khurtsidze – Turan Tovuz (2011)
Nizami Sadıqov – Turan Tovuz
Jaba Tsiklauri – Turan Tovuz
Zaza Latsabidze – Turan Tovuz (2005–06)
Giorgi Modebadze – Turan Tovuz
Gogi Pipia – Turan Tovuz (2012)
Shalva Pirtskhalava – Turan Tovuz (2010)
Imeda Ashortia – Turan-Tovuz (2022–2023)
Piruz Marakvelidze – Turan-Tovuz (2022–)
Tengiz Sichinava – Turan Tovuz (2005), MKT Araz (2006)
Giorgi Gorozia – Zira (2017)

Germany
Joy-Lance Mickels – Sabah (2021–)
Omar El-Zein – Standard Sumgayit (2009–2010)
Murat Doymus – Sumgayit (2012–2013)
Kiyan Soltanpour – Sumgayit (2014–2015)
Göksu Hasancik – Turan Tovuz (2011–2012)

Greece
Charis Komesidis – Bakili Baku (2008)
Aleksios Mikhailidis – Bakili Baku (2008)
Vangelis Mantzios – Baku (2012–2013)
Giorgos Georgiadis – Keşla (2018)
Dimitris Sialmas – Khazar Lankaran (2012–2013)
Vangelis Platellas – Neftchi Baku (2019–2020)
Dimitrios Chantakias – Zira (2020–)
Anastasios Papazoglou – Zira (2019–2020)

Kazakhstan
Anatoli Stukalov – Turan Tovuz (2012–2013)
Rifat Nurmugamet – Sumgayit (2022)
Karam Sultanov – Sumgayit (2020–2021)

Iceland
Hannes Þór Halldórsson – Qarabağ (2018–2019)

Israel
Fares Abu Akel – Gabala (2022–)
Ataa Jaber – Neftçi (2022–)
Idan Weitzman – Simurq (2013–2015)
Amir Agayev – Sumgayit (2019–2020)

Italy
Gianluca Sansone – Neftchi Baku (2019)

Latvia
Oskars Kļava – AZAL (2012–2015)
Nikolajs Kozačuks – AZAL (2009)
Ritus Krjauklis – AZAL (2011)
Deniss Ivanovs – Baku (2011–2013)
Andrejs Štolcers – Baku (2005–2006)
Māris Verpakovskis – Baku (2011–2013)
Pāvels Doroševs – Gabala (2009–2012), Neftchi Baku (2013–2015)
Ģirts Karlsons – Inter Baku (2009–2012)
Vladimirs Koļesņičenko – Inter Baku (2009)
Andrejs Rubins – Inter Baku(2008–2010), Qarabağ(2010–2011), Simurq (2011–2012)
Kristaps Grebis – Kapaz (2011), Simurq (2011–2012)
Deniss Romanovs – Khazar Lankaran (2010–2011)
Igors Tarasovs – Simurq (2012)
Genādijs Soloņicins – Simurq (2009–2010)
Jurijs Ksenzovs – Turan Tovuz (2010)
Mareks Zuntners – Turan Tovuz (2009)

Lithuania
Mindaugas Daunoravičius – AZAL (2011–2012)
Gvidas Juška – AZAL (2010–2011)
Marius Kazlauskas – AZAL (2010), Turan Tovuz (2012–2013)
Andrius Velička – AZAL (2012–2013)
Deividas Česnauskis – Baku (2012–2014)
Robertas Poškus – Inter Baku (2009–2011), Simurq (2011–2012)
Tadas Labukas – Inter Baku (2008–2009)
Tomas Ražanauskas – Inter Baku (2006–2007)
Andrius Gedgaudas – Inter Baku (2006–2008)
Valdas Trakys – Inter Baku (2006–2007)
Edvinas Girdvainis – Keşla (2018–2019)
Darius Žutautas – Khazar Lankaran (2006–2007)
Tadas Simaitis – Kapaz (2015–2017)
Paulius Grybauskas – Neftchi Baku (2009–2011)
Marijanas Choruzijus – Olimpik Baku (2008–2009)
Egidijus Juška – Qarabağ (2006)
Mindaugas Kalonas – Ravan Baku (2013), Baku (2013–2014), Simurq (2014)
Domantas Šimkus – Sabail (2020–2022)
Edgaras Žarskis – Sabail (2017)
Vidas Alunderis – Simurq (2011–2012)
Paulius Paknys – Simurq (2010), Inter Baku (2010–2011)
 Edvinas Lukoševičius – Standard (2008–2009), Karvan (2009–2010)

Montenegro
Miodrag Zec – Baku (2004–2005)
Stefan Vukčević – Gabala (2020–2022)
Mijuško Bojović – Keşla (2019–2021)
Aleksandar Nedović – Inter Baku (2005)
Boban Bajković – Neftchi Baku (2016–2017)
Jovan Drobnjak – Olympic Baku (2006–2008)
Marko Janković – Qarabağ (2022–)
Marko Vešović – Qarabağ (2021–)
Nikola Vujadinović – Sabah (2020–2021)
Aleksandar Dubljević – Turan Tovuz (2011–2012)
Igor Ivanović – Zira (2015–2016)
Miloš Bakrač – Zira (2019–2020)
Bojan Zogović – Zira (2019–2020)

Moldova
Gheorghe Boghiu – AZAL
Stanislav Namașco – AZAL (2014–2016), Shamakhi (2019–2022)
Anatolie Doroş – MKT Araz Imisli, Standard, AZAL, Simurq
Serghei Laşcencov – AZAL
Artur Pătraş – AZAL
Vadim Boret– Baku
Alexei Savinov – Baku
Veaceslav Sofroni – Baku
Victor Comleonoc – Gabala
Anatolie Ostap – Gabala
Vladimir Ţaranu – Gabala
Oleg Şişchin – Inter Baku
Ion Testemiţanu – Inter Baku
Gennadi Ange – Karat Baki
Ion Arabadji- Kəpəz
Denis Calincov – Khazar Lankaran
Victor Barîșev – MKT Araz
Aurel Revenko – MKT Araz
Anatoli Stavila – MKT Araz
Vadim Cricimar – Mughan
Iqor Soltaniçi – Mughan
Petru Racu – Neftchi Baku (2019)
Nicolae Orlovschi – Ravan Baku
Eugeniu Cociuc – Sabail (2018, 2018–2019), Sabah (2020), Keşla (2021)
Alexandru Golban – Simurq
Alexandru Chirilov – Standard Sumgayit
Andrei Chirşul – Standard Sumgayit
Eduard Grosu – Standard Sumgayit
Daniel Pisla – Standard Sumgayit, Turan Tovuz
Victor Gonta – Turan Tovuz
Denis Marandici – Turan-Tovuz (2023–)
Yevgeni Karabulya – Turan Tovuz
Valeriu Onila – Turan Tovuz
Oleg Khromtsov – Turan Tovuz
Alexandru Dedov – Zira (2018–2019)
Gheorghe Anton – Zira (2020)

The Netherlands
Adnan Barakat – Baku (2010–2011)
Dave Bulthuis – Gabala (2017)
Lorenzo Ebecilio – Gabala (2013–2014)
Collins John – Gabala (2011)
Steve Olfers – Gabala (2010–2012)
Ruben Schaken – Inter Baku (2015)
Melvin Platje – Neftchi Baku (2013–2014)
Leroy George – Qarabağ (2013–2015)
Rydell Poepon – Qarabağ (2015–2016)
Mo Hamdaoui – Zira (2021–)

North Macedonia
Robert Petrov – AZAL (2010–2012)
Cvetan Churlinov – Baku (2008)
Gjorgji Hristov – Baku (2008)
Edin Nuredinoski – Baku (2012–2014)
Dragan Načevski – Baku (2009)
Filip Despotovski – Inter Baku (2010–2011)
Ilčo Naumoski – Inter Baku (2013)
Bujamin Asani – Kapaz (2012–2013)
Nikola Gligorov – Khazar Lankaran (2013–2014)
Dejan Blaževski – Khazar Lankaran (2014)
Zoran Baldovaliev – MKT Araz (2005–2006)
Zoran Sterjovski – MKT Araz
Sashko Pandev – Mughan (2010–2011)
Slavčo Georgievski – Neftchi Baku (2010–2012), Inter Baku (2012–2015)
Igor Mitreski – Neftchi Baku (2010–2014)
Vanče Šikov – Neftchi Baku (2016)
Bilal Velija – Olimpik Baku (2008)
Ilami Halimi – Olimpik Baku (2008)
Vladimir Dimitrovski – Qarabağ (2015)
Muarem Muarem – Qarabağ (2012–2015, 2016–2017)
Zakarija Ramazani – Qarabağ 
Artim Šakiri – Qarabağ (2008–2009)
Nderim Nexhipi – Qarabağ (2011–2012)
Florijan Kadriu – Sabail (2020–2021)
Milovan Petrovikj – Sabail (2021)
Tome Kitanovski – Sabail (2018–2019)
Todor Todoroski – Sumgayit (2022-)
Gjorgi Stoilov – Zira (2021)
Yani Urdinov – Zira (2018)

Norway
Tarik Elyounoussi – Qarabağ (2017)

Poland
Tomasz Stolpa – Gabala (2009–2010)
Tomasz Bobel – Neftchi Baku (2009)
Jakub Rzeźniczak – Qarabağ (2017–2019)
Łukasz Sapela – Ravan Baku (2012–2014)
Adam Banaś – Simurq (2014–2015)
Marcin Burkhardt – Simurq (2012–2013)
Paweł Kapsa – Simurq (2013–2015)
Dawid Pietrzkiewicz – Simurq (2012–2013), Gabala (2013–2014, 2015–2017)

Portugal
Paulino Lopes Tavares – Gabala (2009)
Yazalde – Gabala (2014)
Serginho – Kapaz (2016–2017)
Renato Queirós – Khazar Lankaran (2008–2009)
António Semedo – Khazar Lankaran (2011–2012)
Bruno Simão – Khazar Lankaran (2011)
Hugo Basto – Neftçi (2021–2022)
Hugo Machado – Standard Sumgayit (2009–2010)
Filipe Chaby – Sumgayit (2022-2023)
Miguel Lourenço – Zira (2016–2017)

Republic of Ireland
Joe Kendrick – Neftchi Baku (2008–2009)

Romania
Mihay İonesku – Baku
Amiran Mujiri – Baku, Standard
Cristian Valentin Muscalu – Baku
Mihai Panc – Baku
Marius Pena – Baku
Daniel Oprița – Baku
Marius Șuleap – Baku, Inter Baku
Alexandru Benga – Gabala
Andrei Cristea – Gabala
George Florescu – Gabala
Marius Humenike – Gabala
Cristian Pulhac – Gabala
Adrian Ropotan – Gabala
Răzvan Ţârlea – Gabala, Kəpəz
Constantin Arbănaş – Khazar Lankaran
Hristu Chiacu – Khazar Lankaran
Cătălin Doman – Khazar Lankaran
Cosmin Frăsinescu – Khazar Lankaran
Róbert Ilyés – Khazar Lankaran
Adrian Iordache – Khazar Lankaran
Cătălin Liță – Khazar Lankaran
Daniel Munteanu – Khazar Lankaran
Andrei Mureşan – Khazar Lankaran
Nicolae Muşat – Khazar Lankaran
Adrian Piţ – Khazar Lankaran
Alexandru Piţurcă – Khazar Lankaran
Claudiu Răducanu – Khazar Lankaran
Ionuț Savu – Khazar Lankaran
Adrian Scarlatache – Khazar Lankaran, Keşla  (2016–18), Zira  (2018–2020)
Stelian Stancu – Khazar Lankaran
Marian Aliuță – Neftchi Baku
Leonard Naidin – Neftchi Baku
Adrian Neaga – Neftchi Baku
Cătălin Țîră – Neftchi Baku
Darius Miçlea – Sahdag Qusar
Alexandru Popovici – Sabail (2017)
Raul Costin – Simurq
Marius Vintilă – Standard
Gabriel Matei – Zira (2017)

Russia
Nurməhəmməd Murtuzəliyev – Olimpik Baku
Qvanzav Məhəmmədov – AZAL
Arkadi Halperin – AZAL
Akhmed Kurbanov – Olimpik Baku
Marat Izmailov – Gabala
Aliyar Ismailov – Inter Baku
Aleksandr Avdeyev – Karvan
Ivan Vasiliev – Karvan, Ravan Baku
Sergei Bespalykh – Kəpəz
Murat Gomleshko – Kəpəz
Aleksey Kaplanov – Kəpəz
Konstantin Kolesnikov – Kəpəz
Eduard Kokoyev – Kəpəz
Sergey Qordun – Kəpəz
Vladislav Serebriakov – Kəpəz
Mixail Şişlin – Kəpəz
Dmitri Smirnov – Kəpəz
Alan Soltanov – Kəpəz
Nikolay Svezhentsev – Kəpəz
Andrei Sveshnikov – Kəpəz
Aleksandr Çerkasov – MKT Araz
Artyom Bezrodny – MKT Araz
Sergey Chernyshev – Mughan (2011), Ravan Baku (2011–12), Turan-Tovuz (2012), Sumgayit (2017), Kapaz (2017)
Nariman Gasanov – Mughan
Azer Aliyev – Neftçi (2022–)
İslam Basxanov – Neftçi
Rafiq Bulatov – Neftçi
Timur Dzhabrailov – Neftçi
Anzor İsmayılov – Neftçi
Aleksandr Krasnyanski – Neftçi
Məhəmməd Məhəmmədov – Neftçi
İsmayıl Mirzəyev – Neftçi
Anatoli Tebloyev – Neftçi, Gabala
Aleksandr Bakhtin – Qarabağ
Adam Ismailov – Qarabağ
Artur Kişev – Qarabağ, Neftchi Baku
Dmitri Kudinov – Qarabağ
Adam Zeytov – Qarabağ
Sharapudin Shalbuzov – Ravan Baku
Ildar Alekperov – Sabah (2021–)
Shamil Lakhiyalov – Shafa Baku
Sergey Maslov – Shafa Baku
Avtandil Orudzhev – Shafa Baku, Qarabağ
Qurban Əliyev – Shahdag Qusar
Nəriman Fərhadov – Shahdag Qusar
Timur İsrafilov – Shahdag Qusar
Tamerlan Məcidov – Shahdag Qusar
İbrahim Mirzəməhəmmədov – Shahdag Qusar
Anzur Sadirov – Shahdag Qusar
Mixail Sudin – Shahdag Qusar
Ismail Khalinbekov – Shahdag Qusar
Murad Xalidov – Shahdag Qusar
Artur Yunusov – Shahdag Qusar
Kamil Yunusov – Shahdag Qusar
Vasili Yanotovsky – Simurq
Alan Kusov – Standard Baku
Vitali Balamestny – Standard Sumgayit, Gabala
Nasyr Abilayev – Sumgayit
Dzhamaldin Khodzhaniyazov – Sumgayit (2019–2022)
Farkhad Gystarov – Sumgayit
Adil Ibragimov – Sumgayit
Tavakkyul Mamedov – Sumgayit
Khayal Mustafayev – Sumgayit
Shamil Saidov – Turan Tovuz
Rashid Gasanov – Turan Tovuz
Marat Dzakhmishev – Turan Tovuz
Eduard Yeryopkin – Turan Tovuz
 Rustam Shelayev – Shahdag Guba
Aykhan Guseynov – Turan-Tovuz (2022–)

Scotland
Andy Halliday – Gabala (2017)
Graeme Smith – Gabala (2011–12)

Serbia
Branislav Arsenijević – AZAL (2011–14)
Vladimir Bogdanović – AZAL (2013)
Mirko Bunjevčević – AZAL (2010–10)
Mensur Limani – AZAL (2010–12)
Dragan Mandić – AZAL (2006–11)
Saša Vučinović – Bakılı Baku (2008)
Stevan Bates – Baku (2009–10, 2011–12), Khazar Lankaran (2012)
Dejan Branković – Baku (2008–09)
Darko Jovandić – Baku (2006–07)
Nenad Kovačević – Baku (2011–13)
Risto Ristović – Baku (2013–15)
Milan Antić – Gabala (2009–12), Kapaz
Ljuba Baranin – Gabala (2009–11), Kapaz (2011)
Milan Marinković – Gabala (2009)
Nikola Valentić – Gabala (2013–14)
Veseljko Trivunović – Gabala (2011–12)
Goran Arnaut – Inter Baku (2007–10)
Igor Dimitrijević – Inter Baku (2005), Shahdag Qusar (2006)
Nikola Jolović – Inter Baku (2006–07)
Marko Petrović – Inter Baku (2008–09)
Vojislav Stanković – Inter Baku (2014–17), Gabala (2015–16, 2017–2019), Neftçi (2019–)
Milan Zagorac – Inter Baku (2005–10)
Vladimir Zelenbaba – Kapaz (2011)
Miloš Bosančić – Keşla (2018), Sabah (2018–2019)
Nikola Mitrović – Keşla (2018–2019)
Milorad Korać – Khazar Lankaran (2004–06)
Uroš Predić – Khazar Lankaran (2004)
Marinko Petković – Khazar Lankaran (2005–06)
Miroslav Savić – Khazar Lankaran (2004–06), Masallı (2006–08)
Miloš Zečević – Mughan (2007–11), Ravan Baku (2011–13)
Vladimir Mićović – Neftçi (2005–10)
Petar Škuletić – Sabah (2021)
Saša Stamenković – Neftçi (2011–15), Sabah (2018–2021)
Mirko Babić – Olympic Baku (2005–06)
Srđan Baljak – Olympic Baku (2005)
Marko Mitrović – Olympic Baku (2005–06)
Zoran Cilinšek – Qarabağ (2006)
Bojan Pavlović – Qarabağ (2011–12)
Bojan Ilić – Qarabağ (2005–07), Baku (2007)
Uroš Matić – Qarabağ (2020–2021)
Bojan Šaranov – Qarabağ (2016–17)
Slobodan Sladojević – Qarabağ (2006–07)
Miloš Adamović – Ravan Baku (2013–14)
Nemanja Vidaković – Ravan Baku (2011–13)
Filip Ivanović – Sabah (2018–2021)
Dragan Perišić – Simurq (2009–10)
Nenad Begović – Simurq (2009)
Dragan Ćeran – Simurq (2013–15)
Marko Stanojević – Simurq (2014–15)
Nenad Stojanović – Simurq (2012–13)
Dejan Đenić – Standard Baku (2007)
Ognjen Paripović – Standard Baku (2007–08)
Damjan Daničić – Sumgayit (2022)
Zoran Cvetković – Turan Tovuz (2008)
Saša Kovačević – Turan Tovuz (2005–06), Olympic Baku (2006)
Nemanja Andjelkovic – Zira (2021–2023)
Lazar Đorđević – Zira (2020–2021)
Milan Đurić – Zira (2016–2018)
Jovan Krneta – Zira (2015–2018)
Andrija Luković – Zira (2022-)
Miloš Radivojević – Zira (2018–2019)

Slovakia
Pavol Farkaš – Gabala (2014–2015)
Peter Chrappan – Inter Baku (2011–2012)
Ivan Pecha – Khazar Lankaran (2009–2010), Ravan Baku (2013)
Kamil Kopúnek – Ravan Baku (2014)

Slovenia
Lucas Horvat – Baku (2012–2015)
Jure Travner – Baku (2013–2015)
Dejan Kelhar – Gabala (2012–2013)
Nicolas Rajsel – Gabala (2020–2021), Sabail (2021–2022)
Luka Žinko – Gabala (2013)
Dejan Rusič – Khazar Lankaran (2011–2012)
Tomislav Mišura – Neftchi Baku (2005–2006)
Michal Peškovič – Neftchi Baku (2015)
Mitja Mörec – Ravan Baku (2014)

Spain
Juanfran – AZAL (2012–2015), Inter Baku (2015)
Koke – Baku (2012)
Mario Rubio – Baku (2013–2014)
Mario – Baku (2013–2014)
Alberto Noguera – Baku (2013–2014)
Rubén – Baku (2013–2014)
Fernań López – Gabala (2019–2020, 2021–2022)
Mikel Álvaro – Inter Baku (2013–2015)
Iván Benítez – Inter Baku (2013–2015)
Toni Doblas – Khazar Lankaran (2013)
Eduard Oriol – Khazar Lankaran (2013–2014)
Mario Rosas – Khazar Lankaran (2011–2012)
Añete – Neftchi Baku (2015–2016)
Daniel Lucas – Neftchi Baku (2017)
Míchel – Qarabağ (2015–2020)
Gaspar Panadero – Qarabağ (2021–)
Dani Quintana – Qarabağ (2015–2020)
Jaime Romero – Qarabağ (2019–2022)
Juan Cámara – Sabah (2021–2022)
Cristian Ceballos – Sabah (2021–)
Jon Irazabal – Sabah (2022–)
Melli – Simurq (2015), Neftchi Baku (2015–2016)
Tato – Zira (2015–2016)

Sweden
Freddy Borg – AZAL (2013)
Nadir Benchenaa- Khazar Lankaran (2009)
John Pelu- Mughan, Ravan Baku (2011–2012)
Samuel Armenteros – Qarabağ (2015–2016)
Sebastian Castro-Tello – Ravan Baku (2013)
Fredrik Holster – Ravan Baku (2013–2014)

Switzerland
Danijel Subotić – Gabala (2014–2015, 2017)
Innocent Emeghara – Qarabağ (2014–2015, 2018–2019)

Turkey
Mehmet Əli – Qarabağ
Can Akgün – Sumgayit
Göksel Akıncı – Khazar Lankaran
Mehmet Ali Arslan – Gänclärbirliyi Sumqayit
Muhammad Ali Atam – Sumgayit
Devran Ayhan – Khazar Lankaran, Qarabağ
Ali Cansun – Neftchi Baku
Erdal Çelik – Sumgayit
Seyid Cem – Gänclärbirliyi Sumqayit
Firat Çırçı – Bakili Baku, Shafa Baku
Hakan Demir – Qarabağ
Oktay Derelioğlu – Khazar Lankaran
Ahmet Dursun – Khazar Lankaran
Kürşat Duymuş – Baku
Ferdi Elmas – Baku
Muammer Erdoğdu – Khazar Lankaran, Turan Tovuz, Kəpəz, Gabala
Gökhan Güleç – Khazar Lankaran
Erman Güraçar – Gänclärbirliyi Sumqayit
Çətin Günər – Gänclärbirliyi Sumqayit
Mehmet Kahraman – Gänclärbirliyi Sumqayit
Tunc Kip – Khazar Lankaran
Dəniz Kolqu – Khazar Lankaran
Məsut Kumçuoğlu – Khazar Lankaran
İbrahim Mandiralı – Gänclärbirliyi Sumqayit
Abdulkadir Öz – AZAL, Gabala, Bakili Baku
Mustafa Engin Özmən – Qarabağ
Ahmet Öztürk – Gänclärbirliyi Sumqayit
Fatih Sonkaya – Khazar Lankaran
Aydın Tuna – Karvan
Əhməd Ünal – FK Gäncä
Suat Usta – Neftchi Baku
Mustafa Xeyri – Inshaatchi Baku
Atilla Yildirim – Sumgayit (2018–2019)

Ukraine
Valeriy Kutsenko – AZAL (2015), Keşla (2019)
Serhiy Puchkov– Bakili Baku
Viktor Kulykov – Bakili Baku, Shamkir
Ruslan Levyga – Baku
Stanislav Loban – Baku
Oleksiy Antonov – Gabala
Dmytro Bezotosnyi – Gabala (2015–2019)
Volodimir Bondarchuk – Gabala
Ruslan Fomin – Gabala
Ramil Hasanov – Gabala (2014–2018), Sumgayit (2017)
Oleksiy Gai – Gabala
Mykola Hybalyuk – Gabala
Ihor Melnyk – Gabala
Oleh Osadchyi – Gabala
Maksym Skorokhodov – Gabala
Andriy Stryzhak – Gabala (2022-)
Vitaliy Vernydub – Gabala (2015–2018)
Andriy Kandzyuk – Gänclärbirliyi Sumqayit
Dmytro Veremchuk – Gänclärbirliyi Sumqayit
Sergei Chernykh – Inter Baku
Andriy Davydenko – Inter Baku
Oleksandr Kiryukhin – Inter Baku
Yevhen Kotov – Inter Baku
Serhiy Konovalov – Inter Baku
Serhiy Onopko – Inter Baku
Oleh Ostapenko – Inter Baku
Oleksandr Mazinchuk – Karat Baki
Artur Buzila – Karat Baki
Andriy Danayev – Kapaz, Simurq
Yuriy Fomenko – Kapaz (2010–2013), Inter Baku (2013, 2015–2016), AZAL (2013)
Anton Hay – Kapaz (2011)
Ihor Korotetskyi –  Kapaz (2018), Sabail (2018–2019)
Serhiy Litovchenko – Kapaz (2018)
Giuli Mandzhgaladze – Kapaz (2018)
Andriy Sidelnikov – Kapaz
Serhiy Skirda – Kapaz
Oleksandr Sytnik – Kapaz (2015)
Dmytro Klyots – Keşla (2020–2021), Sabah (2021)
Valeriy Kutsenko – Keşla (2019)
Yevhen Kopyl – Khazar Lankaran (2011)
Oleksandr Babak – MKT Araz
İhor Makovey – MKT Araz
Dmytro Parkhomenko – MKT Araz
Yevhen Shiman – MKT Araz
Vitaliy Stepanovych – MKT Araz
Valentyn Vistalyuk – MKT Araz
Oleh Herasymyuk – Neftchi Baku
Volodymyr Olefir – Neftchi Baku
Kyrylo Petrov – Neftchi Baku (2017–2019)
Roman Zub – Neftchi Baku
Vladimir Poşexontsev – Neftchi Baku
Aleksey Stukas – Neftchi Baku
Leonid Kalfa – Neftchi Baku
Vladislav Slepak – Neftchi Baku
Sergey Qribanov – FK Olimpik Baku
Vladimir Boqaç – Qarabağ
Anton Kanibolotskiy – Qarabağ (2017–2018)
Andrey Kolinenko – Qarabağ
Serhiy Kravchenko – Qarabağ
Denys Sokolovskyi – Qarabağ
Artyom Şubin – Qarabağ
Aleksandr Voskoboynik – Qarabağ
Yuri Maksimenko – Sahdag Qusar
Vyacheslav Sidoryuk – Shahdag Qusar, Gabala
Yasyn Khamid – Ravan Baku, AZAL, Zira
Kostyantyn Makhnovskyi – Ravan Baku
Dmytro Bezruk – Sabah (2019–2020)
Marko Dević – Sabah (2018–2019, 2020)
Vitaliy Kvashuk – Sabah (2018)
Oleksiy Kashchuk – Sabah (2022–)
Zurab Ochihava – Sabah (2021–)
Oleksandr Rybka – Sabail (2019–2020)
Maksym Chekh – Sabail (2022–)
Petro Stasyuk – Sabail (2022–)
Serhiy Artiukh – Simurq, Turan Tovuz, Ravan Baku
Yuriy Bulychev – Simurq
Taras Chopik – Simurq
Ruslan Hunchak – Simurq
Yevgeni Kovtunov – Simurq
Volodymyr Kozlenko – Simurq
Mikola Lapko – Simurq
Aleksandr Malygin – Simurq
Volodymyr Mazyar – Simurq, Standard Baku
Andrey Nikitin – Simurq
Vyaçeslav Nevinski – Simurq
Aleksandr Poklonski – Simurq
Vitaliy Postranskyi – Simurq
Andriy Raspopov – Simurq
Sergey Rujitski – Simurq
Serhiy Seleznyov – Simurq
Sergey Şeqlov – Simurq
Yevhen Shmakov – Simurq
Andriy Sokolenko – Simurq
Mykhaylo Starostyak – Simurq
Oleq Timçişin – Simurq
Nikola Zbarax – Simurq
Yuri Donyuşkin – Turan Tovuz
Serhiy Konyushenko – Turan Tovuz
Anton Kovalevsky – Turan Tovuz
Vladimir Kress – Turan Tovuz
Aleksandr Krutskevich – Turan Tovuz, Araz-Naxçıvan
Andrey Qorban – Turan Tovuz
Yevhen Saiko – Turan Tovuz
Serhiy Skachenko – Turan Tovuz
Ruslan Zubkov – Turan Tovuz, Araz-Naxçıvan

CONMEBOL

Argentina
Cristián Ruiz – AZAL (2011)
Leandro Becerra – Baku (2012–2014)
Guillermo Leyvo – Baku (2004–2005)
Fernando Néstor Pérez – Baku (2004–2005, 2007–2009)
Facundo Pereyra – Gabala (2015–2016)
Cristian Torres – Gabala (2009–2011), Ravan Baku (2011–2012, 2013), Qarabağ (2013)
Diego Ruiz – Khazar Lankaran (2010)
Franco Flores – Shamakhi (2019–2020, 2022)
Pablo Podio – Keşla (2018)
Luciano Olguín – Khazar Lankaran (2013)
Hugo Bargas – Neftçi (2017)
Jorge Correa – Neftçi (2021–2022)
Lucas Gómez – Neftçi (2018)
Juan Manuel Varea – Ravan Baku (2012–2014)
Imanol Iriberri – Sabail (2019)
Facundo Cardozo – Sabail (2022–2023)
Franco Mazurek – Sabail (2022–)
Julian Gonzalo Varennes – Standard Baku (2008–2009)
Facundo Melivilo – Zira (2021)

Bolivia
Edemir Rodríguez – Baku (2012–2013)
Augusto Andaveris – Inter Baku (2008–2009)
Julio César Cortez – Standard Baku (2008)

Brazil
Diano – AZAL (2008–2010)
Alessandro De Paula –  AZAL (2007–2008)
Eduardo – AZAL (2014–2015), Zira (2015)
Ismael Silva Francisco –  AZAL (2010)
Junior Ailton – AZAL (2012–2014)
Nildo – AZAL (2012–2013), Khazar Lankaran (2013–2014), Inter Baku  (2014–2015)
Tales Schutz – AZAL (2011–2012), Inter Baku (2012–2013)
William Batista –  Baku (2009)
Flatimir Freytas da Cruz –  Baku (2004–2005)
Kristiano Dos Santos –  Baku (2004–2005)
Renatinho –  Baku (2004–2005)
Roberto Andréo Sergio –  Baku (2004–2005)
Carlos Ribero –  Baku (2004–2005)
Etto – Baku (2013–2014)
Felipe –  Baku (2009)
Jaba– Baku (2009–2012, 2014–2015,)
Wilson Aparecido Xavier Júnior "Juninho" – Baku (2011–2014)
Rafael Barbosa –  Baku (2009)
Adriano –  Baku (2010)
Wênio –  Baku (2010)
Bruno Anjos – Gabala (2010–2011)
Erivelto – Gabala (2008)
Lourival Assis – Gabala (2012–2014)
Bruno – Gabala (2010–2012)
Daniel Cruz – Gabala (2011–2013)
Diego – Gabala (2012–2014)
Dodô – Gabala (2011–2016)
Leonardo – Gabala (2013–2014)
Marquinhos – Gabala (2014–2015)
Ruan Renato – Gabala (2021–)
Rafael Santos – Gabala (2014–2017)
Patrick – Gabala (2022)
Raphael Utzig – Gabala (2020–)
Ricardinho – Gabala (2015–2017)
Tiago – Gabala (2008)
Adriano Gabiru – Inter Baku (2008–2009)
Accioly– Inter Baku (2008–2012)
Dhiego Martins – Inter Baku (2015)
Filipe Machado – Inter Baku (2010–2011)
Cleiton – Inter Baku (2008–2009)
Robertinho – Inter Baku (2013)
João Paulo – Inter Baku (2013–2014)
Flavio Beck – Inter Baku (2013–2014)
Wilson Júnior – Inter Baku (2008–2010)
 Dário – Kapaz (2015–2017, 2018), Neftçi (2018–2019, 2019–2020)
 Dedimar Ferreira – Kapaz (2017–2018)
Juninho Maranhense – Kapaz (2023–)
 Renan – Kapaz (2016–2017)
 Tiaqo Roşa dos Santos – Karvan (2009–2010)
 Dias Kleyton – Karvan (2005–2006)
Junivan – Turan Tovuz (2005, 2009–2010), AZAL (2007–2009), Kəpəz (2010–2012)
Alvaro – Keşla (2020)
Artur – Keşla (2020)
Felipe Santos – Keşla (2021–2022), Gabala (2022–)
Sílvio – Keşla (2020–2021)
Beto – Khazar Lankaran (2012)
Douglas – Khazar Lankaran (2013)
Éder Bonfim – Khazar Lankaran (2011–2013)
Cristian –  Khazar Lankaran (2010)
Fernando Gabriel – Khazar Lankaran (2014–2015)
Osvaldo José Martins Júnior "Juninho" – Khazar Lankaran (2007–2011), Baku (2011–2012), Kapaz (2015–2016)
Mario Sergio –  Khazar Lankaran (2008–2010), Inter Baku (2010), Simurq (2011)
Diego Souza – Khazar Lankaran (2007–2011), Zira (2015–2016), Kapz (2018–2019)
Roberto Santos – Khazar Lankaran (2007–2008)
Rômulo – Khazar Lankaran (2008–2009)
Osmar Sigueira – Khazar Lankaran (2006–2007), Vilash Masalli (2007–2008), Standard Sumgayit/Baku (2008–2009, 2010)
Ricardo Vilana – Khazar Lankaran (2011–2012)
Elias – Khazar Lankaran (2014)
Deyvid Sacconi – Khazar Lankaran (2013–2014)
Thiego – Khazar Lankaran (2014)
Vanderson – Khazar Lankaran (2012–2014)
Jilmar Da Silva – Kapaz (2004–2005)
Selso Ferreyra – Vilash Masalli (2007–2008)
Fabio Ricardo – Vilash Masalli (2007–2008)
Huqo Saldanhaqos – Vilash Masalli (2007–2008)
Tomaş Mavrilyo – MKT Araz (2004–2005)
Alessandro – Neftçi (2010–2012)
Ailton – Neftçi (2015–2016), Qarabağ (2019–2020)
Bruno Bertucci – Neftçi (2012–2014)
Carlos Cardoso – Neftçi (2013–2015)
Cauê – Neftçi (2014–2015)
Denílson – Neftçi (2016)
Flavinho – Neftçi (2010–2015)
Jairo – Neftçi (2015–2017)
José Carlos –  Neftçi (2008–2010)
Ramon – Neftçi (2021–2022), Gabala (2022–)
Rodriguinho – Neftçi (2011–2012)
Thallyson – Neftçi (2020–2021)
Tiago Bezerra – Neftçi (2021–2022)
Guilherme Pato – Neftçi (2022–)
Pessalli – Neftchi Baku (2016)
Saldanha – Neftçi (2023–)
Denis Silva – Khazar Lankaran (2008–2010), Neftçi (2010–2012, 2013–2015), Keşla (2015–2019)
Chumbinho – Qarabağ (2013–2015)
Danilo Dias – Qarabağ (2014–2015)
Kady – Qarabağ (2021–2023)
Júlio Romão – Qarabağ (2022–)
Reynaldo – Qarabağ (2013–2017, 2019)
Pedro Henrique – Qarabağ (2017–2018)
Vagner – Qarabağ (2018–2020)
Igor Souza – Mughan (2010–2011), Ravan Baku (2011)
Júlio César – Ravan Baku (2014)
Thiago Miracema – Ravan Baku (2014–)
Christian – Sabah (2022–)
Higor Gabriel – Sabah (2022–)
Lucas Rangel – Sabah (2022)
Wanderson – Sabah (2018–2019)
Renan Telles – Sabail (2017)
Henrique –  Sabail (2018–2019)
Erico – Sabail (2019–2020)
Gustavo França – Sabail (2022–)
Anderson do Ó – Simurq (2012–2014)
Léo Rocha – Standard Baku (2007), Inter Baku (2009–2010, 2013), Baku (2010), Qarabağ (2011)
Adriano Peixe – Standard Sumgayit (2008–2009)
Rodrigo Silva – Standard Sumgayit (2009)
Diego Carioca – Sumgayit (2023-)
Rudison – Turan Tovuz (2011)
Marco Tulio– Turan Tovuz (2010–2011)
Matheus Albino – Zira (2020–2021)
Filipe Pachtmann – Zira (2021–)
Caio Rangel – Zira (2020–2021)
Welves – Zira (2021)

Chile
Rodrigo Gattas – Gabala (2020)
José Cabión – Neftchi Baku (2013)
Nicolás Canales – Neftchi Baku (2012–2013, 2014–2015, 2016)
Ignacio Herrera – Neftchi Baku (2017–2018)

Colombia
John Córdoba – AZAL (2014)
Jefferson Angulo- Baku (2010)
Jorge Díaz Moreno – Khazar Lankaran (2006)
Rodrigo Rosa Sales – Khazar Lankaran (2006–2007)
Mike Campaz – Neftchi Baku (2018)
Kevin Medina – Qarabağ (2020–)

Paraguay
Isrrael Rodríguez – Baku (2007), Standard Baku (2008)
César Meza – Inter Baku (2013–2015, 2016), Zira (2016–2017), Keşla (2018, 2019–2020, 2020–2021), Neftçi (2021–)
David Meza – Inter Baku (2013–2015), Gabala (2015), Neftchi Baku (2017–2018)
Lorenzo Frutos – Keşla (2019–2020)
Francisco García – Neftchi Baku (2018)
Eric Ramos – Neftchi Baku (2014–2016), Sabah (2018–2019)
Julio Rodríguez – Zira (2019–2020), Sabah (2020–2022)

Peru
Álvaro Ampuero – Zira (2019–2020)

Uruguay
Román Cuello – Inter Baku (2008)
Angel Gutierrez – Standard Baku (2008–2009), Inter Baku (2009–2010), FK Mughan (2010–2011), Ravan Baku (2011)
Walter Guglielmone – Inter Baku (2007–2009), Neftchi Baku (2009–2010)
Álvaro Villete – Sabah (2020–2021)
Daniel Martínez – Standard Baku (2007–2008)
Richard Requelme Chiappa – Standard Sumgayit (2009–2010)

Venezuela
Ángelo Peña – Keşla (2019)
Edson Castillo – Neftchi Baku (2016–2017)

CAF

Algeria
Yacine Hima – Neftchi Baku (2011)
Yassine Benzia – Qarabağ (2023–)
Bilal Hamdi – Zira (2018–2019)

Angola
Alexander Christovão – Keşla (2020–2021)
Aldair Neto – Shamakhi (2021–2022)

Benin
Moïse Adiléhou – Zira (2022–)

Botswana
Mpho Kgaswane – Zira (2019–2020)

Burkina Faso
Narcisse Yaméogo – Mughan (2009–2010)
Moussa Traore – Gänclärbirliyi (2005–2006)
Mayqa Buraimo – Gänclärbirliyi (2005–2006)
Issa Nikiema – Gänclärbirliyi (2004–2005, 2006–2007), Turan Tovuz (2005)
Ben Aziz Dao – Turan-Tovuz (2022–)

Cameroon
Joël Epalle – Baku (2010–2011)
Christophe Atangana – Gabala (2021-)
Kristian Makqoun – Gänclärbirliyi Sumqayit (2005)
Ernest Emako-Siankam – Gänclärbirliyi Sumqayit (2005)
Ghislain Aime Emo – Karvan (2008–2009)
Guy Feutchine – Kapaz (2010–2012)
Patrice Noukeu – Kapaz (2010–2011)
Anatole Abang – Keşla (2021)
Hervé Tchami – Keşla (2018)
Mbilla Etame – Khazar Lankaran (2013–2014)
Julien Ebah – Kapaz (2015–2017)
Valentine Atem – Neftchi Baku (2009–2010)
Ernest Nfor – Neftchi Baku (2013–2015)
Bong Bertrand- Ravan Baku (2011)
Michel Balokog – Ravan Baku (2013–2014)
Romuald Onana – Turan Tovuz (2009–2010)
Rooney Eva – Turan-Tovuz (2022-) 
Rodrigue Bongongui – Zira (2021)
Joseph Boum – Zira (2017–2018)

Cape Verde
Leandro Andrade – Qarabağ (2022–)
Patrick Andrade – Qarabağ (2020–2022)
Vargas Fernandes – Standard Sumgayit (2009–2010)
Steven Pereira – Sumgayit (2022-)

Central African Republic
David Manga – Zira (2017)

Congo
Bruce Abdoulaye – Inter Baku (2012–2014)
Muteba Mwanza – MKT Araz (2004–2006), Olimpik Baku (2006–2007)
Prince Ibara – Neftçi (2020)
Dzon Delarge – Qarabağ (2018–2019)
Ulrich Kapolongo – Qarabağ (2013–2014)
Kévin Koubemba – Sabail (2018–2019), Sabah (2020–2021)

Democratic Republic of the Congo
Freddy Mombongo-Dues – AZAL (2014–2015)
David Mbomboko Fiston Ngoy – Gabala (2007)
Lema Mabidi – Sabail (2020–)

Egypt
Mustafa Moshir– Gänclärbirliyi Sumqayit (2006–2007)
Ahmed Ghanem Soltan – Gänclärbirliyi Sumqayit (2006–2007)
Islam Emad – Kapaz (2011–2012)
Mostafa Afroto – Qarabağ (2012–2013)

Gambia
Maudo Jarjué – Sabail (2017–2019)
Ebrima Sohna – Keşla (2018)

Ghana
Edmond N'Tiamoah – Khazar Lankaran (2007)
Kingsley Atakorah – Khazar Lankaran
Godsway Donyoh – Neftçi (2022–2023)
Kwame Karikari – Neftchi Baku (2018–2019)
Owusu Kwabena – Qarabağ (2020–)
Francis Bossman – Ravan Baku (2012)
Michael Essien – Sabail (2019–2020)
Karim Abubakar – Sumgayit (2023-)
Seidu Salifu – Turan Tovuz (2012)
Richard Gadze – Zira (2017–2018, 2019–2020), Sumgayit (2022-)

Guinea
Kader Camara – Gabala (2007–2009, 2010–2012), Olimpik-Shuvalan (2009)
Oumar Kalabane – Gabala (2012–2014)
Pathé Bangoura – Gänclärbirliyi Sumqayit (2005–2006), Baku (2006), Olimpik Baku (2007–2008)
Karim Bangoura – Gänclärbirliyi Sumqayit (2007–2008)
Sekouba Camara – Gänclärbirliyi Sumqayit (2007–2008)
Saliou Diallo – Gänclärbirliyi Sumqayit (2005–2006, 2007)
Ibrahima Bangoura – Khazar Lankaran (2011)
Mamadou Kane – Neftçi (2019–2021, 2021)
Mamaduba Soumah – Qarabağ (2007–2008)
Amadou Diallo – Sabah (2019–2021)

Guinea-Bissau
David Gomis – Sabail (2023–)
Toni Gomes – Zira (2022-)

Ivory Coast
Serge Djiehoua – Gabala (2011–2012)
Christian Kouakou – Gabala (2019)
Yacouba Bamba – Karvan (2005–2007, 2009–2010), Khazar Lankaran (2007–2009)
Suleyman Camara – Karvan (2005–2008)
Tiemoko Fofana – Sabah (2021–)
Goba Zakpa – Sabail (2022–)
Béko Fofana – Zira (2019)

Kenya
Allan Wanga – Baku (2010)
Patrick Osiako – Simurq (2013–2015)

Liberia
Omega Roberts – AZAL (2017)
Theo Weeks – Gabala (2016–2017)
Isaac Pupo – Qarabağ (2007–2008), Mughan (2008–2009)
Jamal Arago – Sabail (2020–2022)
Terrence Tisdell – Sumgayit (2023-)

Malawi
Robin Ngalande – Zira (2019–2020)

Mali
Famoussa Koné – Gabala (2017–2018)
Cheick Dao Tidiani – Gänclärbirliyi Sumqayit (2006–2007)
Samba Diallo – Kapaz (2017)
Salif Ballo – Khazar Lankaran (2011–2012), Turan Tovuz (2012–2013), Simurq (2013–2014)
Sadio Tounkara – Khazar Lankaran (2012–2015), AZAL (2016–2017), Zira (2017–2019), Shamakhi (2021–2022)
Ulysse Diallo – Sabah (2019–2021)
Alya Toure – Sumgayit (2022)

Mauritania
Diallo Guidileye – Keşla (2018)

Morocco
Zouhir Benouahi – AZAL (2010–2013), Khazar Lankaran (2013–2014)
Ayyoub Allach – Gabala (2023–)
Sabir Bougrine – Neftçi (2020–2021)
Alharbi El Jadeyaoui – Qarabağ (2015–2016)
Faycal Rherras – Qarabağ (2019–2020)

Mozambique
Clésio – Gabala (2019–2020), Zira (2020–2021)

Niger
Ghani Animofoshe – Göyazan Qazax (2004–2006), Olimpik Baku (2006–2007)
Issa Djibrilla – Zira (2023–)

Nigeria
Victor Igbekoi – Turan Tovuz (2005–2006, 2008–2009), Qarabağ (2006–2008), AZAL (2009–15), Zira (2017–2018)
Pius Ikedia – AZAL (2010–2011)
Akeem Latifu – Zira (2017)
Abiodun Lawal – AZAL (2010–2011)
Paul Akpan – Turan Tovuz (2007–2009)
Cud Aqu Aloçukvu – Bakili Baku (2003–2004), Shamkir (2004–2005)
Akinsaya Abiodin – Bakili Baku (2003–2004)
Kinqsli Ukusare – Bakili Baku (2003–2004)
Nkvor Okadinma – Bakili Baku (2004–2005)
Emanuel Olukayode – Bakili Baku (2004–2005), Göyäzän Qazax (2005–2006)
Kollins Smuokhuede – Bakili Baku (2004–2005)
Avqustin Nvabuoku – Bakili Baku (2004–2005)
Ohioze İke Sondi – Bakili Baku (2004–2005)
Emanuel Ode – Bakili Baku (2003–2004), Shafa Baku (2004–2005)
Ahmad Tijani – Shahdag Qusar (2005–2007), Baku (2007–10)
Abdulwaheed Afolabi – Gabala (2013–14)
Ekigho Ehiosun – Gabala (2014–15, 2017)
Ifeanyi Emeghara – Gabala (2018–)
James Adeniyi – Gabala (2018–2019, 2020-2021)
Siti Abdul Taured – Gänclärbirliyi Sumqayit (2005–2008)
Fisayo Abayomi – Göyäzän Qazax (2004–2006)
Tony Alegbe – Inter Baku (2006–2007)
Lucky Idahor – Inter Baku (2004–2006)
Victor Oseghale – Kapaz (2017)
Abdullahi Shuaibu – Kapaz (2022–)
Niji Adekumne – Karvan (2007–2008)
Uchenna Okonkwo – Karvan (2007–2008)
Nathan Oduwa – Shamakhi (2022), Turan-Tovuz (2022-) 
Emeka Opara – Khazar Lankaran (2009–2011), Qarabağ (2013)
Yusuf Lawal – Neftçi (2020–2023)
Stanley Udenkwor – Neftchi Baku (2004)
Ali Abubakr – MKT Araz (2004–2005)
Mondey Etove – MKT Araz (2004–2005)
Oke Akpoveta – Ravan Baku (2014), Sabail (2019)
Emmanuel Apeh – Sabah (2022–)
Erik Obidike – Sahdag Qusar (2004–2005), Turan Tovuz (2007–2008), Mughan (2008), MOIK Baku (2009)
Səid Saladoye – Sahdag Qusar (2005–2006)
Amadi Luki – Shafa Baku (2004–2005)
Uçenna Eme – Shafa Baku (2004–2005)
Antoni Fouye – Turan Tovuz (2008–2009)
Peter Kolawole – Turan Tovuz (2009–2010)
Henry Okebugwu – Turan-Tovuz (2022-) 
Ahmed Isaiah – Zira (2022), Kapaz (2022–)
Chimezie Mbah – Zira (2015–2016)

São Tomé and Príncipe
Harramiz – Neftçi (2021–2022)

Senegal
Kalidou Cissokho – Baku (2004–2012)
Ely Cissé – Baku (2007–2008)
Moustapha Dabo – Gabala (2013)
Victor Mendy – Gabala (2011–2015)
Ibrahima Niasse – Inter Baku (2012–2013), Gabala (2013–2014, 2019–2020)
Aladji Mansour Ba – Kapaz (2017)
Oumar Goudiaby – Keşla (2021)
Mamadou Mbodj – Neftçi (2019–2022)
Magaye Gueye – Qarabağ (2019–2020)
Ibrahima Wadji – Qarabağ (2021–2022)
Abdoulaye Ba – Sabah (2022–)
Pape Samba Ba – Shamkir (2004), Karvan (2005)
Escort Essong – Shamkir (2004–2005)
Sidi Diop – Turan Tovuz (2004–2005)

Sierra Leone
Ibrahim Kargbo – Baku (2010–2013)
Al Bangura – Gabala (2011)
Sidney Kargbo – Kapaz (2008)
John Kamara – Keşla (2019–2021)
Alfred Sankoh – Khazar Lankaran (2014–2015)
Julius Wobay – Khazar Lankaran (2011), Neftchi Baku (2012–2015)
Kabba Samura – Mughan (2009–2010)
Samuel Barlay – Mughan (2010), Ravan Baku (2011–2013, 2015–2016), AZAL (2013–2014)
Sallieu Bundu – Ravan Baku (2012)
Sheriff Suma – Ravan Baku (2011–2012, 2015)
Alie Sesay – Zira (2020–2021), Sabail (2021)

South Africa
Dino Ndlovu – Qarabağ (2016–2018)
Hendrick Ekstein – Sabah (2019), Sabail (2020–2021)
Siyanda Xulu – Turan-Tovuz (2022-)

Togo
Daré Nibombé – Baku (2010)
Yaovi Akakpo – Gabala (2020–)
Arafat Djako – Inter Baku (2012)
Jonathan Ayité – Keşla (2018–2019)
Lalawélé Atakora – Gabala (2018–2019)
Ouro-Nile Toure – Sumgayit (2022)

Tunisia
 Bechir Mogaadi – Karvan (2004–2007, 2009–2010), Olimpik Baku (2008–2009)
 Emir Mkademi – Karvan (2005)

Uganda
Luwagga Kizito – Sabail (2022–)
 Farouk Miya – Sabail (2018)

AFC

Australia
John Tambouras– Neftchi Baku (2008–09)

Hong Kong
Brian Fok – AZAL (2016)

Iran
Farzad Hatami – Gabala (2008–09)
Saman Nariman Jahan – Neftçi (2020–2021)
Reza Bigbelo – Sabah (2018–2019)
Peyman Keshavarzi – Sabail (2020–2021), Kapaz (2022)
Bakhtiar Rahmani – Sabail (2020–)
Ebrahim Abednezhad – Sumgayit (2016)
Peyman Babaei – Sumgayit (2019–)
Saeid Bagherpasand – Sumgayit (2021–2022)
Mehdi Sharifi – Sumgayit (2019–2020, 2021)
Afshin Esmaeilzadeh – Sumgayit (2016)

Japan
Keisuke Honda – Neftçi (2021)
Masaki Murata – Sumgayit (2023-)

Jordan
Omar Hani – Gabala (2021-)

Philippines
Álvaro Silva – Khazar Lankaran (2013–2014)

Tajikistan
Akhtam Khamrakulov – AZAL (2014)
Davron Ergashev – Gabala (2014)
Sokhib Suvonkulov – Ravan Baku (2013)

Turkmenistan
Elman Tagaýew – AZAL (2012–13), Sabail (2017–2018)
 Timur Annamammedov – Karvan – 
 Döwletmyrat Ataýew – Karvan (2009–10)
 Nazar Baýramow – Karvan (2004–07), Neftchi Baku (2007–09)
 Omar Berdiýew – Karvan (2009–10)
 Mämmedaly Garadanow – Karvan (2007–08)
 Myrat Hamraýew – Karvan 2009–2010
 Pavel Kharchik – Karvan (2009), Standard Sumgayit (2010)
 Mekan Nasyrow – Karvan (2004–08), Gabala (2008–09)
 Berdi Şamyradow – Karvan (2004–05)
 Rahimberdi Baltaýew – Kapaz (2003)
 Pirkuli Saparov – Kapaz (2012–13)
 Dmitri Nezhelev – Khazar Lankaran (2004)
 Arif Mirzoýew – Neftchi Baku, Qarabağ (2003–04)
Wahyt Orazsähedow – Sabail (2018)

South Korea
Yoon Soung-min – Gänclärbirliyi Sumqayit (2004–05)

Uzbekistan
Bahodir Nasimov – Neftchi Baku (2010–11, 2011–14), Keşla (2018), 
Alibobo Rakhmatullaev – Ravan Baku (2015)
Oleg Belyakov – Turan Tovuz (2004–05)
Shohrux Gadoyev – Keşla (2020)

CONCACAF

Canada
Adam Hemati – Sumgayit (2020)

Costa Rica
Randall Brenes – Khazar Lankaran (2012)
Diego Madrigal – Inter Baku (2014–15)
Winston Parks – Khazar Lankaran (2010–11), Baku (2011–12)

Curaçao
Ayrton Statie – Sabail (2017–2018)
Rihairo Meulens – Zira (2015–16)

Dominican Republic
Heinz Barmettler – Inter Baku (2012)

El Salvador
Nelson Bonilla – Zira (2015–16)

Guatemala
Nicholas Hagen – Sabail (2020–2021)

Haiti
Soni Mustivar – Neftçi (2018–2020)
Wilde-Donald Guerrier – Qarabağ (2017–2019, 2020-2021), Neftçi (2019–2020), Zira (2023–)
Bryan Alceus – Zira (2022)
Kervens Belfort – Zira (2017)
Sony Norde – Zira (2019)

Honduras
Luis Ramos – AZAL (2014–15)
Allan Lalín – Khazar Lankaran (2009–11)
Roger Rojas – Sabah (2019)

Jamaica
Deon Burton – Gabala (2010–12)
Andre Clennon – Keşla (2018–2019)
Akeem Priestley – Mughan (2009–10)

Mexico
Édgar Pacheco – Sabail (2018)
Osvaldo Lucas – Standard Baku (2008)

Suriname
Dion Malone – Gabala (2017–2018)

Trinidad and Tobago
Shahdon Winchester – Kapaz (2018)
Jomal Williams – Zira (2018)

United States
Kenny Saief – Neftçi (2022–)
 Adan Coronado – AZAL (2016)
Will John – AZAL (2013–14)

Notes

References

External links
1992 Stats
1993 Stats
1993–94 Stats
1994–95 Stats
1995–96 Stats
1996–97 Stats
1997–98 Stats
1998–99 Stats
1999–2000 Stats
2000–01 Stats
2001–02 Stats
2003–04 Stats
2004–05 Stats
2005–06 Stats
2006–07 Stats
2007–08 Stats
2008–09 Stats
2009–10 Stats
2010–11 Stats
2011–12 Stats
2012–13 Stats

 
Azerbaijan Premier League
 
Association football player non-biographical articles